Dronyayevsky is a rural locality (a khutor) in Makarovsky Selsoviet Rural Settlement, Kurchatovsky District, Kursk Oblast, Russia. Population:

Geography 
The khutor is located in the Seym River basin, 65 km from the Russia–Ukraine border, 37 km west of Kursk, 6.5 km north of the district center – the town Kurchatov, 10 km from the selsoviet center – Makarovka.

 Climate
Dronyayevsky has a warm-summer humid continental climate (Dfb in the Köppen climate classification).

Transport 
Dronyayevsky is located 28 km from the federal route  Crimea Highway, 6 km from the road of regional importance  (Kursk – Lgov – Rylsk – border with Ukraine), 2 km from the road of intermunicipal significance  (Seym River – Mosolovo – Nizhneye Soskovo), 6.5 km from the nearest railway halt Kurchatow (railway line Lgov I — Kursk).

The rural locality is situated 43 km from Kursk Vostochny Airport, 134 km from Belgorod International Airport and 247 km from Voronezh Peter the Great Airport.

References

Notes

Sources

Rural localities in Kurchatovsky District, Kursk Oblast